Phlomis longifolia, the long-leaved Jerusalem sage, is a species of flowering plant in the mint and sage family Lamiaceae, native to the hills of Cyprus, Turkey and Lebanon.

The Royal Horticultural Society has given its Award of Garden Merit to the
variety Phlomis longifolia var. bailanica.

References 
 

longifolia
Flora of Cyprus
Flora of Lebanon
Flora of Turkey